The Lawn may refer to:

The Lawn, the academic pavilion at the University of Virginia
The Lawn Ground, the football stadium and former home of Forest Green Rovers F.C.
 The Lawn (Elkridge, Maryland), listed on the NRHP in Maryland
 The Lawn (Nokesville, Virginia), listed on the NRHP in Virginia